22 Yards is a 2018 Indian sports drama film starring Barun Sobti, Rajit Kapur, Panchi Bora and Rajesh Sharma. The film has been directed by sports journalist turned filmmaker Mitali Ghoshal. The film premiered at the 2018 Bay Area South Asian Film Festival and is scheduled to release theatrically on 15 March 2019. The trailer of the film was launched by Sourav Ganguly.

Plot
22 Yards is about a successful sports agent and his fall from grace. The film delves into the commercial aspects of sports. Barun Sobti plays the lead, a cricket enthusiast and a talent manager.

Cast
 Barun Sobti as Ron Sen
 Amartya Ray as Shome Ray
 Panchi Bora as Shonali
 Rajit Kapur as Dr. Zahid Khan
 Rajesh Sharma as Ravi Khanna
 Chaiti Ghoshal as Trishna Ray
 Geetika Tyagi as Rica Sahay

Release and reception
22 Yards had its world premiere at the inaugural Bay Area South Asian Film Festival (BASAFF 2018) where Barun Sobti bagged the Best Actor (Feature) award. The film was slated to release on 22 February 2019, but it has been pushed back to 15 March 2019.

The official trailer of the film was  released on 18 January 2019.

Critical response
Nandini Ramnath in Scroll.in writes, "Barun Sobti scores in a familiar cricketing tale of failure and redemption."

News 18 gave the movie two stars out of five and wrote 'an average film that gives a simplistic insight in to the crafty world of Cricket'.

Soundtrack 

The music of the film has been composed by Amartya Ray and Amartya Bobo Rahut while the lyrics have been written by Amartya Ray and Siddhant Kaushal.

References

External links
 

2018 films
Indian sports drama films
2010s Hindi-language films
Films about cricket in India
2010s sports drama films
2018 drama films